Plectris is a genus of May beetles and junebugs in the family Scarabaeidae. There are more than 360 described species in Plectris.

See also
 List of Plectris species

References

Further reading

 
 
 
 
 

Melolonthinae
Articles created by Qbugbot